"Mexican Girl" is a song by the British rock band Smokie from their 1978 studio album The Montreux Album. It was the album's third and final single. The song first came out in September 1978 as a single and later appeared on the album, which was released in October.

Background and writing 
The song was written by Chris Norman and Smokie drummer Pete Spencer and produced by Mike Chapman.

Commercial performance 
The song reached no. 1 in Germany.

Charts

Weekly charts

Year-end charts

Cover versions 
In 2000 Chris Norman issued his solo version of this song as a single (CD maxi) in Europe.

The version was part of his 2000 studio album "Full Circle".

References

External links 
 Smokie — "Mexican Girl" (1978) at Discogs
 Chris Norman — "Mexican Girl" (2000) at Discogs

1978 songs
1978 singles
Smokie (band) songs
Songs written by Chris Norman
Song recordings produced by Mike Chapman
RAK Records singles
Chris Norman songs
Number-one singles in Germany